Edward Barrett may refer to:

Edward Barrett, 1st Lord Barrett of Newburgh (1581–1645), English politician
Edward Barrett (cricketer, born 1846) (1846–1923), English cricketer
Edward Barrett (Medal of Honor) (1855–?), second class fireman serving in the United States Navy who received the Medal of Honor for bravery
Edward Barrett (Irish sportsman) (1877–1932), track and field athlete, wrestler and hurler
Edward Barrett (English sportsman) (1879–1950), English cricketer and rugby union international, soldier and Commissioner of Shanghai Municipal Police
Edward J. Barrett (politician) (1900–1977), American politician in Illinois
Edward W. Barrett (1910–1989), dean of Columbia School of Journalism
Edward J. Barrett (born 1943), United States Coast Guard admiral
Edward Gabriel André Barrett, United States Navy officer
Ted Barrett (born 1965), baseball umpire
Edward E. Barrett, a 19th-century pilot boat

See also 
Edward Barrett-Lennard (1799–1878), English settler of Western Australia
Ted Barratt (1844–1891), English cricketer